Rustia may refer to:
 Rustia (plant), a plant genus in the family Rubiaceae
 Rustia (cicada), a genus of cicadas